Tanel Talve (born 13 August 1976 in Tallinn) is an Estonian journalist, radio and television presenter and politician. He has been member of XIII Riigikogu.

In 2016 he graduated from University of Tartu's Pärnu College in tourism and hotel management.

From 1994 to 2004 he worked at Estonian Radio, being editor, presenter and reporter. From 2004 to 2019 he worked at television channel Kanal 2, being a presenter and reporter for the news program Reporter, the presenter of the popular science program Galileo and the producer, cameraman, director and presenter of the travel program Motoreporter.

Since 2015 he is a member of Estonian Social Democratic Party.

References

1976 births
Living people
Estonian journalists
Estonian television presenters
Estonian radio personalities
Social Democratic Party (Estonia) politicians
Members of the Riigikogu, 2015–2019
University of Tartu alumni
Politicians from Tallinn
20th-century Estonian people
21st-century Estonian people